Hilton Langenhoven (born 21 June 1983) is a South African athlete and three time Paralympic Champion, competing mainly in category F12 (visual impairment) long jump events. He was born in Somerset West, Western Cape.

He competed in the 2004 Summer Paralympics in Athens, Greece.  There he won a silver medal in the men's Long jump - F12 event, finished eighth in the men's 100 metres - T12 event, finished eighth in the men's 200 metres - T12 event and finished fifth in the men's Javelin throw - F12 event.  At the 2006 Melbourne Commonwealth Games, he won a silver medal in the 100 metres T12 event. He also competed at the 2008 Summer Paralympics in Beijing, China, a gold medal in the men's 200 metres - T12 event, a gold medal in the men's Long jump - F12 event and a gold medal in the men's Pentathlon - P12 event

References

External links
 

1983 births
Living people
People from Somerset West
Paralympic athletes of South Africa
Athletes (track and field) at the 2004 Summer Paralympics
Athletes (track and field) at the 2006 Commonwealth Games
Athletes (track and field) at the 2008 Summer Paralympics
Athletes (track and field) at the 2012 Summer Paralympics
Athletes (track and field) at the 2016 Summer Paralympics
Medalists at the 2004 Summer Paralympics
Medalists at the 2008 Summer Paralympics
Medalists at the 2012 Summer Paralympics
Medalists at the 2016 Summer Paralympics
Commonwealth Games silver medallists for South Africa
Paralympic gold medalists for South Africa
Paralympic silver medalists for South Africa
South African male long jumpers
Visually impaired sprinters
Commonwealth Games medallists in athletics
African Games silver medalists for South Africa
African Games medalists in athletics (track and field)
Athletes (track and field) at the 2015 African Games
Paralympic medalists in athletics (track and field)
Athlone, Cape Town
Sportspeople from the Western Cape
20th-century South African people
21st-century South African people
Medallists at the 2006 Commonwealth Games